Jack English may refer to:

 Jack English (footballer, born 1886) (1886–1953), English footballer and manager
 Jack English (footballer, born 1923) (1923–1985), his son, football forward
 Jack English (photographer) (born 1948), English photographer

See also 
 Jack English Hightower (1926–2013), U.S. representative
 John English (disambiguation)